Smith Creek is a stream in the U.S. state of West Virginia. It is a tributary of the Coal River.

Smith Creek was named after Joseph Smith, a local pioneer.

See also
List of rivers of West Virginia

References

Rivers of Kanawha County, West Virginia
Rivers of West Virginia